Portage Lake is a lake in Otter Tail County, in the U.S. state of Minnesota.

Portage Lake was so named from its location on an old canoe portage route.

See also
List of lakes in Minnesota

References

Lakes of Otter Tail County, Minnesota
Lakes of Minnesota